The Basketball Bundesliga Most Improved Player was an award that was handed out yearly to the player who made the most progress in the regular season of the Basketball Bundesliga. The first time the award was handed out was in 2003, the first winner was Philip Zwiener. Since the 2015–16 season, the award is not handed out any more.

Winners

Awards won by nationality

Awards won by club

References
General

Specific

External links
German League official website 

Most Improved Player
Most improved awards